The use of capital punishment in Italy has been banned since 1889, with the exception of the period 1926–1947, encompassing the rule of Fascism in Italy and the early restoration of democracy. Before the unification of Italy in 1860, capital punishment was performed in almost all pre-unitarian states, except for Tuscany, where it was historically abolished in 1786. It is currently out of use as a result of the adoption of the current constitution, and defunct as of 1 January 1948.

History
In Italy, the first pre-unitarian state to abolish the death penalty was the Grand Duchy of Tuscany as of November 30, 1786, under the reign of Pietro Leopoldo, who later became Leopold II, Holy Roman Emperor. So Tuscany was the first modern state in the world to do away with torture and capital punishment.

However, the death penalty was sanctioned in the codes of law of all the other pre-unitarian states, therefore when the Kingdom of Italy was proclaimed in 1860, legislation was divided, since the death penalty was legal in all of Italy except for Tuscany.

Afterwards, the death penalty was definitively abolished in the Penal Code in 1889 with the almost unanimous approval of both Houses of Parliament under suggestion of Minister Zanardelli. However executions in Italy had not been carried out since 1877, when King Umberto I granted a general pardon (royal decree of pardon of January 18, 1878). Ironically, as a result of this pardon, Gaetano Bresci could not be sentenced to death after he assassinated Umberto I in 1900. The death penalty was still present in military and colonial penal codes, being massively applied during the First World War (1915-1918) for acts of desertion, insubordination and "dishonorable behavior", even against innocent soldiers (practice of decimation ordered by the generals without any decision of the military court).

In 1926, it was reintroduced by dictator Benito Mussolini to punish those who made an attempt on the king, the queen, the heir apparent or the Prime Minister as well as for espionage and armed rebellion. The Rocco Code (1930, in force from July 1, 1931) added more crimes to the list of those punishable with the death penalty, and reintroduced capital punishment for some common crimes. It was used sparsely, however; until the outbreak of war in 1940, a total of nine executions were carried out, allegedly not for political offenses, followed by another 17 until Italy's surrender in July 1943 (compared to almost 80,000 legal executions in Nazi Germany, including courts martial).

The last people executed for civil crimes were three Sicilian robbers, also convicted of murder, who battered and threw into a well ten people (while still alive) on a farm near Villarbasse (province of Turin) in 1945. The president, Enrico de Nicola, declined to pardon them, and they were executed by a firing squad on March 4, 1947 at Basse di Stura riverside, in the suburbs of Turin. This was the last execution in Italy for common crimes, while the next day there was the last execution for war crimes (against members of the National Republican Guard).

The Italian Constitution, approved on December 27, 1947 and in force since January 1, 1948, completely abolished the death penalty for all common military and civil crimes during peacetime. This measure was implemented by the legislative decree 22/48 of January 22, 1948 (provision of coordination as a consequence of the abolishment of capital punishment). The death penalty was still in force in Italy in the military penal code, only for high treason against the Republic or for crimes perpetrated in war theatres (though no execution ever took place) until law 589/94 of October 13, 1994 abolished it completely from there as well, and substituted it with the maximum penalty of the civil penal code (imprisonment for life). In 2007 a constitutional amendment was adopted. Article 27 of Italian Constitution was changed to fully ban the death penalty.

Prior to abolition, the death penalty was sanctioned in article 21 of the Italian penal code. It stated that Death penalty is to be carried out by shooting inside a penitentiary or in any other place suggested by the Ministry of Justice. The execution is not public, unless the Ministry of Justice determines otherwise.

A draft law to ratify the 13th Protocol of the European Convention on Human Rights had been approved by the Senate on October 9, 2008 (it was approved earlier by the Chamber of Deputies on September 24). It was ratified on March 3, 2009.

Public opinion

The President of Italy, Sergio Mattarella, reportedly declared in 2016 that "There will never be full justice in the world, as long as the killing of human beings will not be banned".

Italy proposed the UN moratorium on the death penalty, which urges states to establish a moratorium on executions with a view toward abolition and urged states around the world to approve it. The former Italian Foreign Minister Massimo D'Alema also stated that the next step was to work on abolishing the death penalty.

The 2008 European Values Study (EVS) found that only 42% of respondents in Italy said that the death penalty can never be justified, while 58% said it can always be justified.

See also
 Cesare Beccaria

References 

Italy
Law enforcement in Italy
Legal history of Italy
Death in Italy
Human rights abuses in Italy
1948 disestablishments in Italy
1889 disestablishments in Italy
1926 establishments in Italy